Ngari Günsa Airport , also known as Shiquanhe Airport is a dual-use military and civil airport serving the town of Shiquanhe in Ngari Prefecture, between Gar Chongsar and Sogmai, Günsa Township, Ngari Prefecture, Tibet Autonomous Region.  It started operations on 1 July 2010, becoming the fourth civil airport in Tibet after Lhasa, Nyingchi, and Qamdo airports.

Gunsa airport has a 4,500-meter runway. It is expected to handle 120,000 passengers by 2020. Construction began in May 2007 and cost an estimated 1.65 billion yuan (241.22 million U.S. dollars).

As Shiquanhe (Ali) is only a one-day bus drive (about 330 km) from the settlement of Darchen situated just north of Lake Manasarovar, facing Mount Kailash, it is expected to benefit pilgrims to these two sites, which are considered sacred by Hindus, Buddhists, Bonpa and Jains. With the opening of Shigatse Peace Airport in October 2010, the five airports, coupled with the Qinghai–Tibet railway and a network of roads, are expected to increase tourism to scenic and holy sites in Tibet.

Military buildup 
Since the last major standoff between China and India at Doklam in 2017 military presence at the Ngari Gunsa Airport has been expanded with Shenyang J-16s and J-11s fighter jets stationed. The airport is 200 kilometres from Pangong Tso, Ladakh.

Airlines and destinations

See also
List of airports in China
List of the busiest airports in China
List of highest airports
Ngari Burang Airport

Footnotes

References
Albinia, Alice. (2008) Empires of the Indus: The Story of a River. First American Edition (2010) W. W. Norton & Company, New York. .
Dorje, Gyurme. (2009) Tibet Handbook. Footprint Handbooks, Bath, England. .
 Mayhew, Bradley and Kohn, Michael. (2005) Tibet. 6th Edition. .

Airports in the Tibet Autonomous Region
Airports established in 2010
2010 establishments in China
Ngari Prefecture